Part of the University of Otago's Division of Health Sciences, the School of Pharmacy is based in Dunedin, New Zealand. It is ranked in the world's top-200 universities for pharmacy and pharmacology.

Undergraduate programmes 
The School teaches the four-year Bachelor of Pharmacy (BPharm) and Bachelor of Pharmacy with Honours (BPharm(Hons)) programmes. Admission is competitive, usually following successful completion of the University's Health Sciences First Year programme.

The School has credit transfer agreements with Malaysia's International Medical University and multiple polytechnics in Singapore. These agreements can allow students to obtain an Otago Pharmacy degree in 2–3 years.

Postgraduate programmes 
The School offers the following postgraduate programmes:

 Postgraduate Certificate in Pharmacy
 Postgraduate Certificate in Pharmacy endorsed in Medicines Management
 Postgraduate Certificate in Pharmacy endorsed in Social Pharmacy
 Postgraduate Certificate in Pharmacist Prescribing
 Postgraduate Diploma in Clinical Pharmacy
 Master of Clinical Pharmacy
 PhD

References

External links
 University of Otago School of Pharmacy
 University of Otago

University of Otago
Pharmacy schools